The Legal Consequences of the Separation of the Chagos Archipelago from Mauritius in 1965 is an advisory opinion issued by the International Court of Justice (ICJ)  on the Chagos Archipelago sovereignty dispute in response to a request from the United Nations General Assembly (UNGA). In a 13–1 ruling (with only Judge Joan Donoghue dissenting), the Court deemed the United Kingdom's separation of the Chagos Islands from the rest of Mauritius in 1965, when both were colonial territories, to be unlawful and found that the United Kingdom is obliged to end "its administration of the Chagos Islands as rapidly as possible."

Request 
On 23 June 2017, the UNGA voted in favour of referring the territorial dispute between Mauritius and the UK to the ICJ in order to clarify the legal status of the Chagos Islands archipelago in the Indian Ocean. The motion was approved by a majority vote with 94 voting for and 15 against.

Aftermath
On 22 May 2019, the UNGA voted 116 to 6 (Australia, Hungary, Israel, Maldives, United Kingdom, United States against; 56 abstained) to adopt Resolution 73/295 welcoming the ICJ advisory opinion. The UK House of Commons considered this resolution on 3 July 2019, when Sir Alan Duncan, Minister of State for Europe and North America, stated that "The UK remains committed to seeking resolution of this bilateral sovereignty dispute with Mauritius through direct, bilateral dialogue."

References

External links
 Preliminary objection of the Maldives on the delimitation of the maritime boundary between Mauritius and Maldives, 18 December 2019
 ITLOS rejects all preliminary objections in Mauritius v. Maldives, Fietta LLP
 ITLOS judgement on the preliminary objections of the Maldives, 28 January 2021

2019 in case law
2019 in Mauritius
International Court of Justice cases
2019 in international relations
Chagos Archipelago sovereignty dispute